Simonovski is a Macedonian masculine surname, its feminine counterpart is Simonovska. It may refer to
Kiril Simonovski (1915–1984), Macedonian football player
Marko Simonovski (born 1992), Macedonian football player
Marko Simonovski (basketball) (born 1989), Macedonian basketball player 

Macedonian-language surnames